Ballaios (ruled  260 230 BC) was an Illyrian king of the Ardiaei tribe. Attested only in coinage, Ballaios is considered as the predecessor of Agron. He is considered to have been a powerful and influential king as testified by the abundance of his silver and bronze coinage found along both coasts of the Adriatic. A hoard found in 2010 is one of the biggest hoards of ancient coins known, not only from Illyria. The capital of Ballaios' kingdom was Rhizon.

His silver issues are rare, but bronze coins, without the royal title, occur on Hvar, both in single finds and in hoards, and at Rhizon in a different series bearing the royal title. In the city of Ulcinj there is still a fully functioning water source bearing his name: "Kroni i Ballos". The coins of Ballaios were widely imitated in the region, sometimes so crudely that they are unintelligible.

Reign 

Prior to the recent excavations carried out in the 2010s, archaeologist Arthur Evans dated Ballaios' coinage  between 167 BC and 135 BC, in the period between the fall of Macedon and the expedition by the consul Servius Fulvius Flaccus against the Illyrians. J. M. F. May (1930s) dated it  between 195/190 BC and 175 BC, which was followed by G. Gorini (1991), and Šašel Kos (2007).

After the recent excavations, the archaeological contexts of the coin hoards of Ballaios found in the 2010s indicate an earlier period. Archaeological investigations conducted in the area of Rhizon have revealed that Ballaios was in power and minted coins in the period between  260 and 230 BC, providing a clear dating for his reign.

Coinage 

Ballaios minted coins in his own name. His coins with the long legend ΒΑΣΙΛΕΩΣ ΒΑΛΛΑΙΟΥ (BASILEOS BALLAIOY) were minted in Rhizon while the coins with the short legend ΒΑΛΛΑΙΟΥ and the head of the king Ballaios which is of a different type and are older, were minted in Pharos. In some cases it is possible to observe that Ballaios' coins were over struck on the older Pharos specimens. The distribution of his coinage indicates that they were concentrated in the central Dalmatian area, while the large number of different dies that have been identified to date indicates a long minting of his coins. Numismatic evidence shows that Ballaios reigned for quite a lengthy time. His coins are also frequently found in Italy, which confirms the trade contacts between both Adriatic coasts.

On the obverse of the coins a bust of the king facing left to right is depicted, while on the reverse Artemis, advancing or standing, is represented with or without a torch, sometimes carrying one or two spears, surrounded by either the long or short legend. Most of these coins are bronze, some, and always those with the long legend are silver. Their weight, c. 3.5g corresponds top the Roman victorium. It is significant the Ballaios also had silver coins minted, which indicates his wealth and power, since elsewhere in Hellenistic Dalmatia silver coinage is very rarely documented from Greek/Illyrian mints. The weight of the bronze coins of Ballaios is between 1.0 and 4.5g, while most of the documented specimens weigh between 2.0 and 2.5g. The relatively great impact of the coinage of Ballaios is also indicated by a large number of imitations of his coins. In several instances on some coins, an embossed circular Illyrian shield on one side and the flying horse Pegasus, a mythological creature, and the letter "B", "A" and "L" on the other side, are depicted.

Ballaios' coins were in circulation in the regions along both Adriatic coasts; along the eastern Adriatic, they have been found in a broad area extending from Phoenice in Epirus to Shkodër, in present-day Albania, to Pharos, and along the western Adriatic from Leuca and Locri to Aquileia, indicating trade activity of Ballaios that was no longer controlled by Issa. As expected the coins of Ballaios were also found in the broad area of Narona, the most important Greek/Illyrian emporium which maintained along with the river Neretva, commercial and other contacts with the interior regions or Illyricum.

See also 
List of rulers of Illyria
Illyrian coinage

References

Bibliography

Illyrian kings
3rd-century BC rulers in Europe
Year of birth unknown
Year of death unknown